Sceloporus  torquatus, the crevice swift, is a species of lizard in the family Phrynosomatidae.

Naming
The subspecies Sceloporus torquatus mikeprestoni was named by Hobart Muir Smith and José Ticul Álvarez in honor of professor emeritus of English, Michael J. Preston.

References

Sceloporus
Endemic reptiles of Mexico
Reptiles described in 1828
Taxa named by Arend Friedrich August Wiegmann